Vasily Fedin (18 June 1926 – 6 February 2005) was a Soviet cyclist. He competed in the 4,000 metres team pursuit event at the 1952 Summer Olympics.

References

1926 births
2005 deaths
Soviet male cyclists
Olympic cyclists of the Soviet Union
Cyclists at the 1952 Summer Olympics